Hidan (also Romanized as Hīdān; also known as Hīvān) is a village in Hudian Rural District, in the Central District of Dalgan County, Sistan and Baluchestan Province, Iran. At the 2006 census, its population was 457, in 94 families.

References 

Populated places in Dalgan County